Valdis Dombrovskis (born 5 August 1971) is a Latvian politician serving as Executive Vice President of the European Commission for An Economy that Works for People since 2019 and European Commissioner for Trade since 2020. He previously served as European Commissioner for Financial Stability, Financial Services and Capital Markets Union from 2016 to 2020 and Prime Minister of Latvia from 2009 to 2014.

Dombrovskis served as Minister for Finance of Latvia from 2002 to 2004. He then served as a Member of the European Parliament (MEP) for the New Era Party from 2004 to 2009. He became the Prime Minister of Latvia 2009, serving until his resignation in 2014. He was Vice-President of the European Commission for the Euro and Social Dialogue from 2014 to 2019. Following the resignation of Lord Jonathan Hill, Dombrovskis served as European Commissioner for Financial Stability, Financial Services and the Capital Markets Union from 2016 to 2020. Following the resignation of Phil Hogan, it was announced that he would take over the portfolio for Trade.

Education and science career
Born in Riga to a family with Polish roots (the original Polish surname is Dąbrowski), Dombrovskis earned a bachelor's degree in economics for engineers from Riga Technical University in 1995 and a master's degree in physics from the University of Latvia in 1996. He worked as a laboratory assistant at the Institute of Physics of the University of Mainz in Mainz, Germany, from 1995 to 1996, as an assistant at the University of Latvia's Institute of Solid-State Physics in 1997, and as a PhD student at the A. James Clark School of Engineering at the University of Maryland, College Park for electrical engineering in 1998.

Political career

Career in national politics
In 2002, Dombrovskis became a board member of the New Era Party. He was Minister of Finance from 2002 to 2004 and a Member of the Latvian Parliament during its 8th parliamentary term (2002–2004). Then he was Observer at the Council of the European Union (2003–2004).

Member of the European Parliament, 2004–2009
As Member of the European Parliament, Dombrovskis was a member of three European Parliament Committees: Committee on Budgets, Delegation to the ACP-EU Joint Parliamentary Assembly, Delegation to the Euro-Latin American Parliamentary Assembly. He is also a Substitute at Committee on Economic and Monetary Affairs, Committee on Budgetary Control and delegation to the EU-Kazakhstan, EU-Kyrgyzstan, and EU-Uzbekistan Parliamentary Cooperation Committees, and for relations with Tajikistan, Turkmenistan and Mongolia.

Dombrovskis was also one of six Members of the European Parliament participating in the European Union's observer mission in Togo for the October 2007 Togolese parliamentary election.

Prime Minister of Latvia, 2009–2014
On 26 February 2009, following the resignation of Ivars Godmanis, President Valdis Zatlers nominated Dombrovskis to succeed Godmanis as Prime Minister. It was believed that his government would consist of three of the four previously governing parties (all but Godmanis' LPP/LC), his own New Era Party, and a smaller right-wing party (the Civic Union); the government was approved on 12 March 2009.

Dombrovskis resigned as Prime Minister on 27 November 2013 following the Zolitūde shopping centre roof collapse in which 54 people were killed. He announced that a new government is needed with strong support in the parliament after the tragedy, considering all related circumstances. His spokesman said that "the government takes political responsibility for the tragedy". He denied the president had urged him to step down, stating that he had considered the decision for days and that the country needs government with strong support in parliament in the moment of crisis.

Member of the European Commission, 2014–present
In February 2014, Dombrovskis officially lodged his application to be the candidate of the centre-right European People’s Party (EPP) for the presidency of the European Commission; shortly after he withdrew his candidacy to endorse Jean-Claude Juncker instead. The Latvian government later nominated Dombrovskis to be the country’s European Commissioner.

Dombrovskis served as European Commission Vice-President for the Euro and Social Dialogue from 2014 to 2019. From July 2016, he was also in charge of the financial services portfolio formerly overseen by British Commissioner Jonathan Hill, who resigned after the Brexit vote. In addition, he has been serving as co-chair of the EPP Economic and Financial Affairs Ministers Meeting – alongside Petteri Orpo (2016-2019) and Paschal Donohoe (since 2019) – which gathers the center-right EPP ministers ahead of meetings of the Economic and Financial Affairs Council (ECOFIN).

Following the 2019 European election, Dombrovskis was nominated by the coalition government of Prime Minister Arturs Krišjānis Kariņš for a second term as Latvia's European Commissioner. He subsequently decided to relinquish the seat he won in the election; he was succeeded by Inese Vaidere. Ursula von der Leyen has since proposed that Frans Timmermans, Margrethe Vestager and Dombrovskis all serve as Executive Vice-Presidents of the commission with Dombrovskis having responsibility for an "Economy that Works for People". As Vice-Presidents of the commission, Dombrovskis has been a co-chair of the Trade and Technology Council since its creation in 2021.

Supporter of the University of Latvia Foundation 
Dombrovskis is a supporter of the University of Latvia Foundation. In 2018, he donated 1,500 euros, awarding 3 one-time Valdis Dombrovskis Excellence Scholarships to Bachelor of Science students of the University of Latvia.

Other activities
 European Bank for Reconstruction and Development (EBRD), Ex-Officio Member of the Board of Governors (since 2019)

Personal life
He is married to Ārija Dombrovska. The two have no children. Dombrovskis plays basketball and goes skiing in his freetime.

See also
First Dombrovskis cabinet
Second Dombrovskis cabinet
Third Dombrovskis cabinet
Capital Markets Union

References

External links

The Cabinet of Ministers of the Republic of Latvia

|-

|-

|-

|-

|-

1971 births
Living people
Politicians from Riga
Latvian people of Polish descent
New Era Party politicians
New Unity politicians
Prime Ministers of Latvia
Ministers of Finance of Latvia
Deputies of the 8th Saeima
Deputies of the 10th Saeima
Deputies of the 11th Saeima
Latvian European Commissioners
New Era Party MEPs
MEPs for Latvia 2004–2009
MEPs for Latvia 2014–2019
University of Latvia alumni
Riga Technical University alumni
Recipients of the Order of Prince Yaroslav the Wise, 2nd class
Recipients of the Order of the Cross of Terra Mariana, 1st Class
European Commissioners 2014–2019
European Commissioners 2019–2024
Recipients of the Order of Prince Yaroslav the Wise, 1st class